The Haunted were a Canadian garage rock band from Montreal, Quebec. The band was formed by Jurgen Peter (guitar) in 1965, and went on to release several records before finally disbanding in 1971. They were among the first Canadian bands to achieve a level of success in their musical genre.

History
In 1965, Jurgen Peter joined up with Bob Burgess (vocals), Pierre Faubert (lead guitar), Glenn Holmes (bass), and Peter Symes (drums) to form The Haunted. Besides Jurgen Peter, the other constant band member through most of its six-year history was Al Birmingham. The band membership that recorded the band's best known song, "1-2-5" was composed of Al Birmingham (lead guitar), Jurgen Peter (rhythm guitar), Bob Burgess (vocals), Mason Shea (bass) and Dave Wynne (drums).

The band's first big break came after winning a Battle of the Bands at the Montreal Forum in 1965, beating such competitors as David Clayton-Thomas and the Shays. The first prize was studio time, bankrolled by Quality Records, that they used to record the two songs on their first single, "1-2-5", with "Eight O'Clock This Morning" as the B-side. The execs at Quality Records were enthusiastic about "1-2-5" but objected to the original lyrics, so a "clean" version with different lyrics was also recorded. The single (with the alternate "clean" lyrics) was released on Quality in early 1966. The first pressing of this record had the band name misprinted as "The Hunted". Ironically, the later pressings with the band's name correctly spelled, are now more difficult to locate.

The single achieved substantial local success, then broke nationally, making the Canadian version of the national charts (RPM Weekly Magazine.) The song gained enough attention in the United States to attract a US release of the single on the Amy record label, who released the original "uncensored" version. Several more singles, as well as a self-titled album over the next two years, served to increase their popularity. Their final single, "Vapeur Mauve" is a French language version of Jimi Hendrix's "Purple Haze".

The band grew to be one of the most in demand bands in Canada for the balance of the 1960s and into the early 1970s. Symes decided to fold the band in 1971, commenting as follows: "We were the most sought after and highest paid Canadian band for many years. When I folded the band in 1971, I had to cancel a whole year of advance bookings and it cost me a fortune in lawyer's fees to get out of some of them."

Subsequent to the breakup of the band, control of the band's name appears to have been lost.  As of 1996, the name is most closely associated with a Swedish heavy metal band.

Reissues
Bomp!, on their Voxx label released two albums of music by The Haunted in 1983, in their series 'Rough Diamonds' on garage bands having more than just a few songs available. A 22-song CD called The Haunted was released by Voxx in 1995. These albums were made from existing and well worn vinyl records. However, the Voxx CD is still the easiest way to get all of The Haunted's 1960s catalog. In 2009, the Quebec-based reissue label, Hungry for Vinyl, re-issued the 1967 Trans-World LP. This is the first legitimate re-issue of the re-mastered album in its original form. The pressing was limited to 1000 copies.

Discography

Studio albums

Compilations

Singles

References

External links
 Hungry For Vinyl Records

Canadian garage rock groups
Musical groups from Montreal
Protopunk groups
Musical groups established in 1965
Musical groups disestablished in 1971
1965 establishments in Quebec
1971 disestablishments in Quebec